Michael Killisch-Horn (died 16 February 2019) was an Austrian politician who served as a Member of Parliament between 1986 and 1990.

References

1940s births
2019 deaths
Austrian politicians